Abdulgazino (Äbdelğäze) is a rural locality (a village) in Amangildinsky Selsoviet, Abzelilovsky District, Bashkortostan, Russia. The population was 295 as of 2010. There are 5 streets.

Geography 
Abdulgazino is located 30 km west of Askarovo (the district's administrative centre) by road. Amangildino is the nearest rural locality.

Ethnicity 
The village is inhabited by Bashkirs and others.

References 

Rural localities in Abzelilovsky District